Hosoya Station is the name of two train stations in Japan:

 Hosoya Station (Gunma)
 Hosoya Station (Shizuoka)